Caliban's War is a 2012 science fiction novel by James S. A. Corey (pen name of Daniel Abraham and Ty Franck). It is about a conflict in the Solar System that involves Earth, Mars, and the Asteroid Belt (colonies of people living on asteroids, referred to as "Belters"). It is the second book in The Expanse series and is preceded by Leviathan Wakes. The third book, Abaddon's Gate, was released on June 4, 2013. One of eight short stories and novellas published by James S. A. Corey, entitled "Gods of Risk", takes place directly after the events of Caliban's War.

Setting
Eighteen months after the events of Leviathan Wakes, the polities  of the solar system remain in precarious balance as they watch unknowable events unfold on Venus. Earth and Mars are still poised for battle, however, not recognizing the dire warning that the Eros Incident held for humanity.

Plot summary
In the prologue on Ganymede Mei Meng is taken from her preschool by her doctor, who has her own authority to do so. Told that she is being taken to her mother, she is instead presented with a grotesquely transformed male human in a transparent vat and starts screaming.

Several hours later Earth and Martian space marines, who had been in a boring stand-off guarding their respective pods on the surface, are attacked and effortlessly slaughtered by an alien super soldier which is impervious to their weaponry; Sgt. Bobbie Draper, a Martian marine, is the only survivor. This incident precipitates a shooting war between Earth and Mars war which throws Ganymede into chaos. Mei's father Praxidike "Prax" Meng, a botanist whose life work had been crushed by a deorbited solar mirror fruitlessly searches throughout the cascading societal breakdown for his daughter.

Several months later the Rocinante is tasked with delivering emergency aid to Ganymede by OPA. Prax spots James Holden in the immediate aftermath of the latter having quelled a food riot and asks help in find his daughter. They agree, and are able to trace her and her kidnappers to one of the many long in disuse tunnels of which the moon is replete. Holden, Prax, and ship mechanic Amos Burton discover a secret lab. In the midst of a shootout with lab security, they inadvertently release another alien super soldier or mechanism  which kills several lab personnel. In the wake of the battle, the crew find remnants both of the protomolecule and the corpse a friend of Mei's, who had also been treated by Mei's doctor for immunodeficiency. As yet more chaos erupts around them they flee on board the Rocinante.

Following hospitalization and debriefing, but still suffering from untreated PTSD, Sgt. Draper is brought to the peace talks between Earth and Mars on Earth to give eye-witness testimony regarding the alien attack on Ganymede. (It is also revealed that a mysterious energy burst from the Protomolecule complex on Venus occurred virtually simultaneously with this attack.) She violates diplomatic protocol, however, and is dismissed by the Martian delegation, but is then hired by Chrisjen Avasarala, the leader of the UN negotiations. Draper learns that Avasarala's assistant is betraying her, leading Avasarala to conclude that her UN superiors are trying to get rid of her, from which Draper deduces that a group within the UN is responsible for the super soldier attack. Avasarala allows Draper to be brought along as her bodyguard on a slow-moving yacht headed to Ganymede on an ostensible relief mission.

On their way to Tycho station, the Rocinante crew discovers a super soldier stowed away in their cargo hold. They are able to lure out the creature using radioactive bait before vaporizing it with the ship's exhaust. The Rocinante is damaged during the encounter, but the crew learns more about the alien machines. Holden confronts Fred Johnson, whom he believes controls the only other sample of the Protomolecule. Johnson denies any involvement with the Ganymede incident and summarily fires Holden's crew. They help Prax release a video asking for help searching for Mei, raising enough money to continue the search. Upon receiving information about Mei's doctor, he deduces that the super soldiers are being created on a base on Io. With the Rocinante repaired, they set out to recover Mei.

On board the yacht, Avasarala sees Meng's video appeal and learns that a UN detachment is heading to intercept the Rocinante. The crew of the yacht prevent her from warning Holden, claiming that their communication systems are broken. When they refuse her demands to get the yacht repaired, Avasarala has Draper take control of the vessel. Avasarala sends a warning to Holden, and she and Draper board a racing pinnace to rendezvous with the Rocinante. After meeting Holden's crew, Avasarala and Draper share notes on the Protomolecule super soldiers.  

Realizing that they are several days away from being destroyed by the UN detachment, Avasarala convinces the crew to let her send this information to her contacts within the UN to prevent an all-out war. Draper and Avasarala convince the Martian fleet to help protect the Rocinante. This culminates in a space battle between the UN detachment, the Martian forces, and a second UN fleet loyal to Avasarala. With the UN Secretary General recalling the admiral hostile to the Rocinante, the battle ultimately ends in victory for the Martians and Avasarala's faction.

The crew lands on Io, where Amos and Meng rescue Mei along with other immunodeficient children, and Draper kills a Protomolecule soldier using his hard-won knowledge about its capabilities. The crew heads back to Luna, where those responsible for the super soldier project are brought to justice. Avasarala is promoted, Prax is hired to oversee efforts to restore Ganymede, Draper returns to Mars, and the Rocinante takes a contract escorting a supply ship.

Throughout the story, all of the involved parties of the solar system had been closely monitoring mysterious changes on Venus —which culminate with the launch of something of massively unknown purpose (which perforce puts their own machinations in perspective). Furthermore, in the final line of the epilogue Detective Miller reappears more than a year-and-a-half after his apparent demise, and nonchalantly swatting an ultraviolet firefly from his cheek says to Holden "Hey... We gotta talk."

Characters

 James Holden is the captain of the salvaged Martian warship Rocinante. He and his crew have worked for the Outer Planets Alliance for 18 months since what's become known as the Eros Incident, and the job hasn't worn well. Whist assisting botanist "Prax" in the search for his daughter, Holden comes across signs that people are still trying to tame the protomolecule, and the threat hits very close to home. Breaking his OPA ties, he becomes an ever-more-important piece in a four-way chess game for who —or what— will run the solar system.
 Chrisjen Avasarala is a high-ranking UN official who knows how to get things done. Plugged in to a myriad sources of information, she's simultaneously monitoring events on Earth, Mars, Ganymede, and Venus. Seeing shifts coming but not able to completely grasp what they mean, she accepts a post that takes her away from the action knowing she is playing her expected part until it is time to do the unexpected. She then meets James Holden, who is trying to defuse a war.
 Bobbie Draper is a Martian Marine stationed on Ganymede, one of Jupiter's largest moons and known as the breadbasket of the outer planets. After she witnesses the brutal defeat and destruction of military forces on both sides of a conflict by an alien third party, including her entire platoon, she is taken to Earth to participate in peace talks. Not following the party line, however, she is dismissed. Now attached to Chrisjen Avasarala, she must continue to adapt to interplanetary politics and office intrigue. With her duties later taking her back to space, however, her military training comes in handy once again.
 Praxidike Meng is a botanist working on Ganymede when tensions erupt. His daughter is lost in the chaos, and he finds information that she was actually taken from her daycare before the action had commenced. He tries to find her in the decaying conditions of his home, but finally latches on to James Holden as his only source of hope. Eventually becoming the public face of the crisis at Ganymede, his efforts to find his daughter's abductors prove to have interstellar ramifications.

Reception
Critical reception for Caliban's War was predominantly positive, with Kirkus Reviews noting that the book could be enjoyed as a standalone novel but was "best appreciated after volume one". Wired.com's Geek Dad and Publishers Weekly both praised the novel, with GeekDad citing the book's "believable human personalities and technology that is easily recognizable" as a highlight. Tor.com gave an overall positive review for Caliban's War, but noted that there was "some rather tiresome dialogue in the cards, as well as an overabundance of laughably transparent politics, and a couple of at best cartoonishly characterised bad guys".

References

External links
 The authors' blog
 The series' web site 

The Expanse
2012 American novels
2012 science fiction novels
Novels about extraterrestrial life
Fiction set on Ganymede (moon)
Fiction about main-belt asteroids
Novels set on Mars
Novels by James S. A. Corey
Fiction about the Solar System
Space opera novels
American science fiction novels
Orbit Books books